The Generals of the Yang Family is a collection of Chinese folklore, plays and novels on a military family from the earlier years of imperial China's Song Dynasty (960–1279). The stories recount the unflinching loyalty and the remarkable bravery of the Yangs as they sacrificed themselves to defend their country from foreign military powers, namely the Khitan-ruled Liao Dynasty (907–1125) and Tangut-ruled Western Xia (1038–1227).

Spanning the century from 950 to 1050, the mostly fictional saga was based on the lives of historical characters Yang Ye (died 986), Yang Ye's son Yang Yanzhao ( 958–1014) and Yang Yanzhao's son Yang Wenguang (died 1074). As Yang Yanzhao was nicknamed "6th son" (六郎) in history, the stories made him Yang Ye's 6th eldest son. Also, as Yang Wenguang was close to 2 generations younger than his father, the stories made him Yang Yanzhao's grandson instead.

Historical basis

Historical background

In 907, when the once-glorious Tang Dynasty officially ended, imperial China entered the chaotic and fragmented phase known as the Five Dynasties and Ten Kingdoms period. The decades that followed were marked by regional warlords, many legitimizing themselves as emperors, fighting amongst one another for power and territories. The year 907 also marked the beginning of such a militaristic state — officially called the Liao after 947 — established by Khitan people in roughly today's Liaoning and Inner Mongolia. The Khitans were largely nomadic people and frequently engaged in raids of the more affluent agricultural Han Chinese and Korean people in the south for wealth.

The southern area known as the Central Plain, or the Chinese heartland, defended against the Khitan incursions with strategical points or passes established roughly along the line of the old Great Wall. However, the area including these passes, known as the Sixteen Prefectures, were given to the Liao Dynasty in 936 by general Shi Jingtang, in exchange for military aid in Shi's personal war against the Later Tang. With no more passes impeding their army, the Khitans gained unlimited access to the Central Plain: just a decade later, they easily took their army south to extinguish the same Later Jin they helped Shi establish.

Even though the Khitans did not occupy the Central Plain, partially because their constant looting had caused unmanageable unrest, the sad fate of Later Jin already illustrated the danger looming in the north for any succeeding Chinese dynasty. When the Song Dynasty was established in the Central Plain in 960, it first tried to appease the Liao Dynasty to focus on campaigns against the states in southern China, but the goal of recovering the Sixteen Prefectures had always been there.

The Yang family

Yang Ye, a general of the Northern Han Kingdom, was nicknamed "Invincible" (無敵) due to his tactical prowess and unmatched gallantry in battle. He served the Song Dynasty after Liu Jiyuan, ruler of Northern Han, surrendered. Emperor Taizong of Song had great faith in Yang Ye and commissioned him to defend Song's northern border from the Khitan-ruled Liao Dynasty, which Yang Ye proved himself by defeating in the Battle of Yanmen Pass, instilling fear in the enemy but also incurring jealousy of some Song officials.

In 986, during a northern campaign against Liao forces, the Song force commanded by General Pan Mei was attacked by main enemy force along the way. Pan Mei and others forced Yang Ye to lead an army to resist a much larger enemy despite Yang Ye's opposition. Yang Ye engaged Liao forces in a bloody battle at Chenjiagu (陳家谷), but reinforcements did not arrive as promised. Surrounded by the much larger army, Yang Ye was captured by Liao forces and starved himself to death. One of Yang Ye's seven sons was killed. Pan Mei was later demoted by Emperor Taizong for Yang Ye's death.

The most outstanding of Yang Ye's seven sons was Yang Yanzhao, who continued defending Song's northern border from Liao forces for more than two decades and the Khitans feared him. Yang Yanzhao's son Yang Wenguang also became an important general and followed Di Qing on a southern campaign against Nong Zhigao. He also defended Song's western borders from Western Xia.

Literary development

Early development: 11th to 13th centuries
Legends on the Yang family began very early. In 1051, even before Yang Wenguang distinguished himself in the military, scholar Ouyang Xiu had inscribed the following on the tombstone of a Yang family relative. He was clearly referring to Yang Ye and Yang Yanzhao:

The earliest reference to the saga were from the so-called Southern Song (1127–1279), when the Song Dynasty had to relocate its capital to Southern China in Lin'an (modern Hangzhou, Zhejiang), for its northern territory had been conquered by the Jurchen-ruled Jin dynasty. Among a recorded list of stories told by Lin'an storytellers, two titles clearly involved the Yang family:
 "Commander Lord Yang" (楊令公)
 "The fifth son becomes a monk" (五郎為僧)

Yuan/Ming Dynasty plays: 14th to 15th centuries
In a list of plays from Southern Song Dynasty's northern neighbor Jin dynasty (1115–1234), one title probably refers to an episode in the Yang saga:
 Da Wang Shumi Cuan (打王樞密爨; "The Skit of Beating Military Affairs Commissioner Wang")

By the Yuan Dynasty (1271–1368), plays in the form of zaju on the Yang saga appeared. Many scripts survived in its entirety, almost all compiled the Ming Dynasty so their authenticity have

 Haotian ta Meng Liang dao gu (昊天塔孟良盜骨; "At Haotian Pagoda Meng Liang Steals the Bones")
 Ba dawang kaizhao jiu zhongchen (八大王開詔救忠臣; "The Eighth Great Prince Opens a Proclamation and Saves a Loyal Vassal")
 Xie Jinwu zha chai Qingfeng fu (謝金吾詐拆清風府; "Xie Jinwu Underhandedly Tears Down Clear Breeze Mansion")
 Yang Liulang diaobing po tianzhen (楊六郎調兵破天陣; "Yang's 6th son lines up his troops and defeats the Heavenly Battle Array")
 Jiao Guangzan huona Xiao Tianyou (焦光贊活拿蕭天佑; "Jiao Guangzan catches Xiao Tianyou alive")
 Huang Meiweng cifu shangshou (黃眉翁賜福上壽; "The Yellow-Eyebrows Greybeard offers blessing and extends longevity")

Ming/Qing Dynasty novels: 16th to 19th centuries
In Ming Dynasty (1368–1644), a number of novels on the Yang family began to appear. The two that have survived to this day both appeared during Wanli Emperor's reign (1572–1620):

  The earliest extant version was from 1593, but it was probably written during Jiajing Emperor's reign (1521–1567). The author was almost certainly Xiong Damu (熊大木), a bookstore owner.
  The earliest extant edition was from 1606, but it was likely a slightly revised edition of text from the early 16th century. The author was Qinhuai Moke (秦淮墨客; "The Qinhuai Ink Guest"), believed to be the pen name of Ji Zhenlun (紀振倫), probably a bookstore scribe in Jinling (金陵; modern Nanjing, Jiangsu).

These novels would become the primary source materials for the legends. In Qing Dynasty (1644-1911), more novels appeared. Some are modifications of the previous novels, some retold particular stories, while some are sequels. Other novels with similar settings would also feature characters from the Yang family, for example the novels featuring Zhao Kuangyin (927–976) or Di Qing (1008–1057) as their main character.

Other novels in later settings also included characters who were alleged descendants of the Yang family:
"Blue Faced Beast" Yang Zhi (楊志), a character in the classical novel Water Margin, is a fictitious descendant of Yang Ye.
Yang Zaixing (died 1140), a historical general of the Southern Song Dynasty, was said to be a descendant of Yang Ye through Yang Yanzhao in the novel Shuo Yue Quanzhuan (說岳全傳) about Yue Fei. Yang Zaixing had two sons, Yang Zhengyuan (楊正園) and Yang Zhengguo (楊正國).

Qing Dynasty opera: 19th century

The Jiaqing Emperor, who reigned from 1796 to 1820, ordered the compilation of a Song Book to Enlighten Generations (昭代箫韶), containing 240 plays in kunqu about the generals of the Yang family. The compilation was published in 1813 and attributed to Wang Tingzhang (王廷章) and Fan Wenxian (范聞賢).

Over the years the opera series was only performed 3 times due to its length. Later, Empress Dowager Cixi ordered its modification into the Peking opera version, a huge project that lasted from 1898 until 1900 when it was interrupted by the Boxer Rebellion and subsequent foreign invasions.

In addition to the plays shown in the Forbidden City, qinqiang, yuju, pingju and many other local Chinese opera forms have all throughout the centuries developed their own stories about generals of the Yang family. Many of the stories aren't found in novels and have vastly enriched the legends. In the 20th century, the stories were greatly popularized in China through the performing art pingshu (storytelling).

Basic story

During the Song Dynasty's invasion of the much weaker Northern Han Kingdom, Emperor Taizu of Song's army was surprised by Northern Han general Yang Ye and suffered a major defeat. Song general Pan Renmei was almost killed by Yang Ye and the Song army had no choice but to retreat. Years later, Emperor Taizu's successor Emperor Taizong initiated another invasion, again stopped by forces led by Yang Ye, his wife She Saihua, and their 7 sons. Pan Renmei was injured by an arrow from She Saihua. Emperor Taizong had to bribe corrupt Northern Han officials who spread rumors to create distrust between Northern Han's ruler Liu Jiyuan and Yang Ye. This eventually led to Liu Jiyuan's defeat and surrender.

After Yang Ye's reluctant surrender, Emperor Taizong awarded his family an impressive mansion in the capital Kaifeng called "Heaven Wave House". Gratified, Yang Ye swore allegiance to the emperor and defeated the Liao Dynasty forces from Song's northern borders again and again. The jealous Pan Renmei, also the emperor's father-in-law, offered to the emperor to name his son Pan Bao the vanguard, but the other ministers were not convinced since Pan Bao had no experience. Pan Renmei then offered to start a martial arts tournament in Kaifeng's Tianqi Temple, but specified that the Yang family shall not participate. The emperor agreed. Yang Ye locked his sons at home, but on the last day the 7th son sneaked out the house, joined the tournament, and killed Pan Bao who had been using underhand means to defeat his opponents.

After several attempts to kill Yang family members failed, Pan Renmei turned to the Liao army for help and assisted them in luring and besieging the outnumbered Yang Ye, his 7 sons and Emperor Taizong in the border city of Youzhou. With no better options available, Yang Ye's 1st son volunteered to dress as the emperor and meet the Liao prince for a risky peace talk called the "Double-Dragon Meet" in Golden Beach, while the real Emperor Taizong escaped. As feared, the meeting turned out to be a trap, and only his two youngest sons remained when Yang Ye and his men retreated to Twin Wolves Mountain. Yang Ye asked his 7th son to fight a way out to Pan Renmei's camp for reinforcement. The 7th son managed to reach Pan Renmei, but was drugged, tied up and shot to death by countless arrows.

Severely outnumbered in the trap and with no sight of reinforcement, Yang Ye also learned the confirmed deaths of his eldest 3 sons. To avoid being captured, he committed suicide by knocking his head against a stone tablet bearing Li Ling's name. His 6th son managed to fight a way out back to the Song territory, but was confronted by generals ordered by Pan Renmei to kill him. Instead, the generals who all respected Yang Ye told him about his 7th brother's death and let him go. On the way back to Kaifeng, the 6th son also befriended a man named Wang Qin, who unbeknownst to him was a Liao spy.

When Emperor Taizong received the 6th son's report about Pan Renmei's crimes, he also received a report by Pan Renmei accusing the Yangs of treason. The first judge of the case was bribed by Pan Renmei's daughter Consort Pan and tried to help the Pans but that was stopped by the emperor's nephew Zhao Defang, also known as the "Eighth Virtuous Prince". The second judge escaped from his post for fear of offending the Pans. After a long time, the Eighth Virtuous Prince finally located a candidate for the post, a provincial official named Kou Zhun, who despite having only held tiny posts before, had a reputation of intelligence and moral principles. Finally Kou Zhun convicted Pan Renmei of multiple crimes and executed him with the help of the Eighth Virtuous Prince.

As the new commander of the Song army succeeding his father, the 6th son Yang Yanzhao continued to fight the Liao forces under the new emperor. Emperor Zhenzong honored the Yang family by building a stone epitaph, which was disrespected by Xie Jinwu - the son-in-law of Wang Qin who had since become a high official. After Xie Jinwu received a heavy beating by the women in the Yang household, trouble began to arise which resulted in Yang Yanzhao being notified at the border. Worried about his mother, he, without permission, violated the military rules to rush back to the capital with a subordinate Jiao Zan, who couldn't control his anger and killed Xie Jinwu, creating more trouble.

Finally reinstated, Yang Yanzhao accidentally noticed that his 5th brother was a monk at Mount Wutai. Having given his soul to the Buddha in despair after the fighting at Golden Beach, the 5th brother now refused to participate in the Song army or return home, but he proved that blood is thicker than water by helping his brother at a critical time and killing the enemy. Meanwhile, their sister - Yang Ye's 8th child - learned that her father's remains and golden sabre were kept by the Liao in Haotian Pagoda so she went across the border by herself in an attempt to retrieve the items. She was arrested but escaped with help from someone who turned out to be her 4th brother, now under the false identity "Mu Yi" and had married a Liao princess.

When Yang Zongbao, the son of Yang Yanzhao and Princess Chai, travelled to the Muke Fort in search of the Dragon Subduing Wood, which would help in breaking Liao army's Heaven Gate Formation, he met Mu Guiying, who married him after capturing him. Mu Guiying would prove instrumental in breaking the Heaven Gate Formation with the rest of the Yangs.

Around that time, Western Xia invaded Song, and Yang Zongbao was killed in action. When Yang Yanzhao died, there were few males left in the Yang family; so, the twelve women in the family participated in the campaign against Western Xia. The female generals of the Yang family proved that they were not inferior to their male counterparts.

Historical and cultural sites

Due to the popularity of the stories throughout the Chinese-speaking world, numerous memorial sites including temples and tombs have been built over the centuries throughout China to commemorate Yang Ye and the Yang family. Many locations have no known and realistic relationship with the Yangs, yet still claim that events from the stories occurred there. Some of the most well-known sites include:

 Invincible Yang Temple (楊無敵廟) in Gubeikou, Beijing, built some time before 1055, when the location was still under Liao control. Over the years many generals renovated the temple to pay their respects, including Xu Da in the 14th century and Feng Yuxiang in the early 20th century. It was destroyed in the Cultural Revolution but has since been rebuilt according to old photos.
 Tian Bo Yang House (天波楊府) in Kaifeng, Henan, the capital of Song Dynasty during the Yangs' time. The name "Tian Bo" (天波; literally "Heaven Wave") is the name of the house of the Yangs in popular legends. The house was built in 1992 as a tourist attraction. The location in Kaifeng was chosen based on records written in the 14th century. Some historians doubt whether the Yangs actually had a house in Kaifeng like the records claimed.
 Yang Family Ancestral Hall (楊家祠堂) in Dai County, Shanxi. Allegedly this is the location of Yang family when Yang Ye was serving the Northern Han Kingdom. It was built in 1329.
 Yang Family City (楊家城) in Shenmu County, Shaanxi, Yang Ye's birthplace. The city walls were built in 748, but at least since 1098 it has been called Yang Family City. The Seven-Star Temple (七星廟) where Yang Ye and She Saihua allegedly married is about 25 km away (the name of course refers to their 7 sons).

Modern references
Stories about the Yang family have been retold in the form of folk tales, stage plays and opera, novels, manhua (comics), films and television dramas.

Literature
 Wilt L. Idema and Stephen H. West's The Generals of the Yang Family-Four Early Plays, offers a complete translation of four early plays of the Yang Family Generals.
Yang Zhi (Water Margin), the Blue-Faced Beast of the Water Margin, is a fictional descendant of the Yang Generals.  
In Louis Cha's Condor Trilogy, Yang Tiexin (楊鐵心), Yang Kang (楊康) and Yang Guo (楊過) are fictitious descendants of Yang Zaixing.

Opera and music

Composer Du Mingxin wrote a Beijing opera to a Chinese libretto titled Yang Men Nü Jiang. The opera was based on the Yangju opera Commanding the Troops at 100 Years Old, and was first performed in 1960 by the China Peking Opera Company. The opera is set during the war between the Northern Song Dynasty and the Kingdom of Western Xia, after the death of Song general Yang Zongbao. Yang Zongbao's 100-year-old grandmother, She Saihua, along with Mu Guiying and other widows of the Yang family, lead the Song army to resist the invaders.

In 2000 Du Mingxin also produced a symphonic version of the opera for the China Philharmonic Orchestra (CPO), consisting of an overture, three movements and an epilogue. This was the first symphonic work commissioned for the newly established CPO at that time.

Films

Musical films
 How Muk Kwai-ying Thrice Captured and Released Yeung Chung-bo (穆桂英三擒三縱楊宗保), a 1956 Hong Kong film in Cantonese opera.
 Eighth Sister Yeung (楊八妹招親), a 1956 Hong Kong film in Cantonese opera.
 How Muk Kwai-ying and Yeung Chung-bo Defeated the Heavenly Gate Militia (穆桂英楊宗保大破天門陣), a 1957 Hong Kong film in Cantonese opera.
 Mu Guiying Battling in Hongzhou (穆桂英大戰洪州), a 1958 Chinese film in Peking opera.
 Mu Guiying Takes Command (穆桂英掛帥), a 1958 Chinese film in Yu opera.
 The Fourth Son (四郎探母), a 1959 Hong Kong film in Cantonese opera.
 Golden Sword (楊八妹取金刀), a 1959 Hong Kong film in Cantonese opera.
 Yang Female Warriors (楊門女將), a 1960 Chinese film in Peking opera.
 Conqueress (無敵楊家將), a 1961 Hong Kong film in Cantonese opera.
 Muk Kwai-ying Finds a Husband (穆桂英招親), a 1962 Hong Kong film in Teochew opera.
 She Saihua (佘賽花), a 1984 Chinese film in the shangdanglaozi (上黨落子) opera genre.

Television series

Musical television series
 The Generals of the Yang Family (楊家將), a 1982 series in Taiwanese opera produced by CTS (Taiwan), starring Yang Li-hua as Yang Yanzhao. in 1986, this TV series sequel from 薛丁山救五美 as the last part. 
 The Generals of the Yang Family (楊家將), a 1985 series in Taiwanese opera also produced by CTS, starring Yeh Ching as Yang Yanzhao.
 She Saihua (佘賽花), a 2005 Chinese series in Peking opera first broadcast on CCTV-11.
Animation television series
 The Generals of the Yang Family (楊家將), a 2011–2013 Chinese series first broadcast on CCTV-14, so far airing 3 seasons.

Video games
 Yang's Troops
 Yīmén Yīngliè Yángjiā Jiāng, also known as Yang Warrior Family, is an unlicensed beat 'em up game for the Mega Drive that was published in 1990s. It was developed by Taiwan Sanxun Information Co., Ltd. (台湾三协资讯股份有限公司).

Footnotes

References

Sources

External link

 
Chinese literature
Song dynasty in fiction
Five Dynasties and Ten Kingdoms in fiction
Liao dynasty in fiction
Western Xia in fiction